The discography of Natalie Imbruglia, an Australian pop/rock singer, consists of six studio albums, one compilation album, one extended play, and seventeen singles. Imbruglia debuted in 1994 as an actress on the Australian soap opera Neighbours. In 1996, she began composing songs and signed a recording contract with RCA Records in the United Kingdom.

Imbruglia's debut album Left of the Middle was released in November 1997. The album reached number one on Australian albums chart and was certified platinum five times by the Australian Recording Industry Association (ARIA). On the UK albums chart, it reached number five and was certified triple platinum by the British Phonographic Industry (BPI). Left of the Middle sold over seven million copies and produced three top five singles. Her second album, White Lilies Island, was released in November 2001. It reached number three in Australia and was certified gold. The album reached number fifteen in the UK and was certified gold. White Lilies Island produced three singles, two of which reached the top forty in Australia. Counting Down the Days, her third album, was released in April 2005. It reached number twelve in Australia and number one in the UK. It produced two singles and was certified gold in the UK. Glorious: The Singles 97–07, a greatest hits collection, was released in September 2007. It reached number five in the UK and was certified gold. Since 1997, Imbruglia has sold over 10 million albums worldwide.

Albums

Studio albums

Compilation albums

Extended plays

Singles

Promotional singles

Music videos

Other appearances
These songs have not appeared on a studio album released by Imbruglia.

References
Notes

General

 [ "Natalie Imbruglia > Discography"]. AllMusic. Retrieved 14 January 2009.
 [ "Natalie Imbruglia > Credits"]. AllMusic. Retrieved 14 January 2009.

Specific

External links

Discographies of Australian artists
Pop music discographies